Yehia el-Fakharany; born April 7, 1945 in Mansoura, Dakahlia Governorate, Egypt is an Egyptian television and film actor.

Early years

El-Fakharany earned a bachelor's degree in medicine and surgery from Ain Shams University in Cairo in 1971. He was a prominent member of the university's theatre troupe, and he won the best actor award at the level of Egyptian universities. After his graduation, El-Fakharany practiced medicine for a short period as a GP in the Medical Services Fund within the Egyptian television,
and he intended to specialize in psychiatric and neurological disorders, but his passion for acting pushed him to leave the medical profession and chose to fulfill his desire to be an actor. He thus began his artistic career on stage where he starred in the play "Everyone with His Own Truth" (LiKullin Haqiqatuhu, لكلٍ حقيقته). After that he moved to television where he was cast in "Carefree Days" series (Ayyam Al-Marah, أيّام المرح) in 1972, and in 1979 he became famous with the series "My Dear Children, Thank You" (Abnai'y l-Aʿza', shukran, ًأبنائي الأعزاء شكرا) while the first film he starred in was "Ah, Ya Layl, Ya Zaman" in 1977 (آه يا ليل يا زمن) beside Warda Al-Jazairia and Rushdy Abaza. Since then he has appeared in over 50 TV shows, 39 movies and 9 plays.

Personal life
Yehia el-Fakharany is married to Lamis Gaber, a Coptic physician and writer, author of the screenplay of "King Farouq" series (2007). They have two children: Shady and Tarek, two grandsons (Yehia and Adam El fakharany) and a granddaughters, Lamis, Salma.

Shadi el-Fakharany, the elder son of the Egyptian artist, graduated from the Film Institute in the late 1990s, and worked as an assistant director in some cinematic productions, and he is now in film directing. He collaborated with his father in several projects, among them the 2012 Ramadan series "The Foreigner Abd el-Qader" (Al-Khawaga Abd al-Qader, الخواجة عبد القادر). El-Fakharany's younger son Tariq works in business management, and he previously acted alongside his father in the movie "Ali Baba's Trial" (Muhakamat Ali Baba, محاكمة علي بابا) in 1983.

Public life
In October 2020 Yehia el-Fakharany was sworn in as a member in the Egyptian Senate. El-Fakharany was appointed by the Egyptian President, Abdel Fattah el-Sisi, after he and the artist Samira Abdel Aziz were chosen as representatives of Egyptian art within the Senate.

On her turn, in December 2015, Lamis Gaber was appointed by President Abdel Fattah el-Sisi a member of the Lower House of the Parliament from among the 28 representatives whom the President of the Republic is entitled to appoint.

Major roles

Main TV drama series 
One of the most important roles in Yehia el-Fakharany's career was in the Egyptian drama "El-Helmiyya Nights" (Layali el-Helmiyya, ليالي الحلمية), whose events embodied modern Egyptian history from the era of King Farouk until the early 1990s. The series was written by screenwriter Osama Anwar Okasha, and created together with his lifetime friend, director Ismail Abdel Hafez. It was presented along 8 years in 5 parts, from 1987 to 1995. El-Fakharany plays Salim el-Badri Pasha, an aristocratic young man who returns to Egypt from his foreign mission during Sadat's "infitah," or open-door economic policy and inherits a property of his father, Ismail el-Badri. His role was played by the artist in the first four parts of the series, while he appeared as a guest of honour in the fifth part. Regarding the character of Salim el-Badri, El-Fakharany said: "The screenwriter offered me to play the character of the Mayor, but it was not clearly defined to me, so I did not accept it. Then he offered me the character of the Pasha, and I chose it immediately as it is a flesh and blood character that eats, drinks, loves and hates, so I loved it and made it real as much as the public loved it and was filled with its presence". A large number of Egyptian artists participated in the series (more than 300 actors).

Many expected that Yehya el-Fakharany would remain a prisoner of the character Salim el-Badri Pasha for many years, but he surprised everyone with a different type of Ramadan roles and characters that he embodied throughout the past years and he achieved great success with them, some of which surpassed the fame of Salim el-Badri. One of these was the character of "Abd al-Mutaal Mahjoub" in the series "No" (Lā, لا), through which he became a "persecuted employee" and El-Fakharany excelled as usual to the point that the great screenwriter Mustafa Amin called him and said: “Had I not known Abd al-Mutaal, the hero of my novel personally, I would have imagined that he is you.” With this great testimony from Mustafa Amin, El-Fakharany became more dedicated and involved in his artistic path and he only agreed to play good parts. As for the role of Abd al-Mutaal, the actor said: "I find my first experience with Mustafa Amin a real pleasure, especially since my role in the series was completely new and never performed before [...]. The most beautiful thing about the whole work is the freedom the television provided in broadcasting this work without any objection".

Another major role was in "The Foreigner Abd el-Qader" (Al-Khawaga Abd al-Qader, الخواجة عبدالقادر), an Egyptian series produced in 2012 and premiered in Ramadan. It was written by the screenwriter Abdel Rahim Kamal who was inspired by the stories heard from his father during childhood, and directed by Shady el-Fakharany.
The events of the series alternate between two periods of time, the first during World War II, which tells the story of Herbert Dobberfield, an alcoholic English man with suicidal tendencies who's awaiting death, until he travels to Sudan to work in a stone quarry and his view upon life changes dramatically. He gets acquainted with the mystic sheikh Abd el-Qader of whom he had had visions back in England, and slowly comes out of the state of depression while embracing Sufism. He then moves to Upper Egypt where he falls in love with a spiritual woman (played by the Syrian actress Sulafa Memar) and struggles to marry her despite her brother's refusal; the second period deals with the modern times in which the story of Herbert Dobberfield or "Al-Khawaga" Abd al-Qader is narrated after he has passed away by people who were his contemporaries and were deeply fond of him. 
Even though it tackles the religious life that is so highly valued in Egypt especially during the month of Ramadan, the series through its directing techniques and plot had a very particular approach compared to other Ramadan series given the mystical atmosphere throughout the main character's journey. This effect is reinforced by the soundtrack signed by the renowned Egyptian composer Omar Khairat while using the lyrics of the Persian mystic, poet and teacher of Sufism Al-Hallaj from his collection of poems "Diwan al-Hallaj".

About the reasons for him shining in the month of Ramadan on the small screen, El-Fakharany said: "There is no doubt that I am lucky for my television work, as all my roles are substantial and untried and they add to my experience. I'm also lucky because my work takes the blessing of the holy month and succeeds".

Screenwriter Abdel Rahim Kamal has announced his return to cooperation with actor Yehya el-Fakharany and director Shady el-Fakharany in the upcoming Ramadan season (2021) with the TV series "Naguib Zahi Zarkash" (نجيب زاهي زركش), a comedy that talks about the relationship between a father and his children. The series “Naguib Zahi Zarkash” represents the fifth cooperation between Kamal and El-Fakharany, and the fourth between him and Yahya and Shadi el-Fakharany after “Eagerness”, 2015 (Lahfa, لهفة), “The Foreigner Abd el-Qader” and "Devil", 2016 (Wanous, ونوس), while the series "Hammam, the Arab's Shaykh", 2010 (Shayẖ El-ʿArab Hammam, شيخ العرب همام) was directed by Hosni Saleh.

El-Fakharany dubbed cartoon films produced by the Walt Disney Company, and in the film "The Yacoubian Building" (2006) he had the role of the narrator. The film is based on Alaa al-Aswany's famous novel and is one of the most expensive productions ever made in Egypt.

Theatre 

As for theatre, Yehya el-Fakharany's major role is that of “King Lear” in an adaptation of Shakespeare's tragedy by director Ahmed Abdel Halim who turned it into a successful and popular theatrical work in Egypt. It was presented on the stage of the National Theatre in Cairo, using the music of the Egyptian composer Rageh Daoud and the poems of Ahmed Fouad Negm. As the director explained, he resorted to using Ahmed Fouad Negm's poetry because it is familiar to people, and because it is like an "analgesic" in terms of dramatic effects so it does not seem to interfere with the play. "This is an element of the theatrical performance, and one may have noticed the audience's response to it. There is no doubt that Yehya el-Fakharany's starring and his presence are a matter of attracting the masses. One of the characteristics of Yehya el-Fakharany is that he is an adventurous artist and that he invades the unknown - he invades it with his creative abilities in a field which is new for him: classical Arabic language and Shakespeare." The play was attended by a very ordinary audience, and the actors feared that people would not appreciate the show, nor they would understand it, but the crew was surprised by the audience's reaction as soon as the show started. “King Lear” was first presented to the public in 2001 and was a great success while still being performed today.

El-Fakharany's most recent role on stage was in the vaudeville "A night of A Thousand Nights", 2015 (Layla min 'Alf Layla, ليلة من ألف ليلة), also performed at the National Theatre in Cairo (Al-Jumhuriyya Theatre), recently restored. On the evening of September 27, 2008, the stage and the auditorium had been subjected to a tremendous fire that severely damaged the theatre building, so the Ministry of Culture decided to conduct an integrated restoration and development project which lasted 6 years, with a cost that amounted to about 104 million Egyptian pounds. "A night of a Thousand Nights" was thus among the first shows performed on the freshly restored stage and witnessed unprecedented popularity and financial success. The performance is based on the poetry of Egyptian poet Bayram al-Tunisi accompanied by the music of Egyptian composer Ahmed Sedki, and is directed by Mohsen Helmy.
The story revolves around Al-Shahhat (The Beggar) played by El-Fakharany, who is begging with his daughter by singing in the streets of a town where the Caliph took power at a young age after the death of his father. The caliph falls in love with the daughter of Al-Shahhat and disguises as the son of the gardener. The girl falls in love with him without knowing his identity. On the other hand, the wazir's wife, a playful woman, gets acquainted with Al-Shahhat without knowing his financial and social status, as she is deceived by his tidy clothes that her husband the wazir had given to him before.

In an interview taken by the famous Egyptian TV host Mona el-Shazly in 2015 while sitting on the very stage of the National Theatre, El-Fakharany made some relevant remarks about the vaudeville "A night of A Thousand Nights" and about his career in general, mentioning that he acts for the ordinary people because it's them who make up the public. His deep respect for his work and the public has him arrive at the rehearsals with sharp punctuality which is not easy to meet by his colleagues, as timing is not always a strong feature of the Eastern artists. El-Fakharany compared theatre to marriage, saying that he has to like the people he works with, otherwise the outcome may be compromised. Related to picking up roles that turn into successful performances, he quoted an inspiring byword in English: "There's always a risk for every great decision, but the risk of doing nothing is always much greater".

El-Fakharany rarely agrees to be interviewed as he prefers the public to associate him with his roles and he does not wish to interfere in their perception of him while appearing on social media.

Filmography

Television

Films

Awards and distinctions 
El-Fakharany won about 50 awards during his artistic career, among them the Carthage Film Festival Award for the film "He went out and never came back" (Kharag wa lam yaʿud, "خرج ولم يعد") in 1984, the Catholic Cultural Center Award for the film "Return of a Citizen" (ʿAudat muatin, "عودة مواطن") in 1984 and the State Encouragement Prize in Arts from the Supreme Council of Culture in 1993. He also won the Cairo Arab Media Festival Award, the Award for Excellence in Acting from the 4th National Fiction Film Festival for "The Land of Dreams" (Ard el-Ahlamm, "أرض الأحلام"), and the Mustafa Amin and Ali Amin Award for the series "El-Ḥilmiyya Nights" (Layaly el-Hilmiyya, "ليالي الحلمية") in 1993.

El-Fakharany received the Faten Hamama Appreciation Award at the closing ceremony of the 38th Cairo International Film Festival in 2016.

The actor was awarded at the Abu Dhabi Festival in 2020 during a grand ceremony at the Cairo Opera House. Hoda al-Khamis Kanoo, founder of the Abu Dhabi Group for Culture and Arts and artistic director of the Festival, said at the award ceremony, “Today we honour with all gratitude Yehya el-Fakharany, the physician who chose the most difficult and tough profession, the profession of arts. He chose it with the belief that arts, culture, science and enlightenment are the basic pillars of humanity's renaissance, and most of all the pulse of our existence. Yehya el-Fakharany takes us with an exceptional talent to another world, a world in which all differences fade, a world whose people share their different thoughts and feelings, laughing and crying together, and at the same time he takes us to the magic of drama whose wonderful stories we live in cinema, television and theatre."

El-Fakharani was awarded the distinction of Doctor Honoris Causa twice, the first one from the University of Wales in Cairo in 2013, together with Egyptian actor Nour El-Sherif, Nabila Ebeid, and the renowned composer Omar Khairat, and the second one from Cape Breton University in Cairo in 2017, together with the Emirati artist Hussain Al Jassmi.

References

External links
 
 Ah, Ya Layl, Ya Zaman, 1977 film on YouTube in Arabic
 Yehia el-Fakharany talks about Ah, Ya Layl, Ya Zaman film on Dailymotion.com in Arabic
 Layali el-Helmiyya series, 1987, first episode on YouTube in Arabic
 No series, 1994, first episode on YouTube in Arabic
 Mabrouk & Bulbul, 1998, film on Dailymotion.com in Arabic
 The Yacoubian Building, 2006, film on YouTube with English subtitles
 Al-Khawaga Abd al-Qader series, 2012, first episode on YouTube in Arabic
 2012 Interview taken by Rola Kharsa, on YouTube in Arabic
 2014 Interview taken by Lamis al-Hadidi, CBC Channel Egypt, on YouTube in Arabic
 2015 Interview taken by Mona el-Shazly, CBC Channel Egypt, on YouTube in Arabic
 Yehia el-Fakharany receiving the Faten Hamama Appreciation Award, 2016, on YouTube in Arabic

Egyptian male film actors
Egyptian comedians
1945 births
Living people
Ain Shams University alumni
Male actors from Cairo
Egyptian male stage actors
Egyptian Muslims
Egyptian male voice actors